Love Island is a Greek dating reality show based on the British series Love Island. It premiered on 29 September 2022, on Skai TV. The show was hosted by Iliana Papageorgiou.

History
On April 2022, Skai TV announced that will air the show on 2022-2023 television season. On 8 August 2022, it was announced that Iliana Papageorgiou will be the host of the show. The first season was filmed in Tenerife. The launch show was originally scheduled to be broadcast on 27 September, but was postponed out due to extreme weather conditions in Tenerife.

Islanders
The Islanders for the first series were released on 23 September 2022, just one week before the launch.

Coupling
The couples were chosen shortly after the islanders enter the villa.

Notes

 : Alexandros K. arrived after the coupling on Day 1, but was told he would be able to steal a girl for himself on Day 2. He picked Christina, leaving Giorgos single.
 : After the initial recoupling, host Iliana revealed that there would be a twist. The girls were presented with envelopes, with each containing the name of a male Islander. The name written inside of the envelope determined who their partner would be.

References

External links
 

Skai TV original programming
2020s Greek television series
2022 Greek television series debuts
2022 Greek television seasons
Greek-language television shows
Greek television series based on British television series
Love Island (franchise)